Pachysphinctes is an extinct genus of ammonites belonging to the Perisphinctidae family.

Fossil record
Fossils of Pachysphinctes are found in marine strata of the Jurassic (age range: from 150.8 to 145.5 million years ago.).  Fossils are known from some localities in Antarctica, Cuba, Germany, India, Madagascar and Yemen.

References

Jurassic ammonites
Ammonitida genera
Perisphinctidae